Winny Chebet (born 20 December 1990) is a Kenyan middle-distance runner competing primarily in the 800 metres. She represented her country at the 2013 World Championships reaching the semifinals. In addition she won silver medals at the 2006 World Junior Championships and 2005 World Youth Championships.

Her personal best in the 800 metres is 1:59.30 from 2013.

She qualified to represent Kenya at the 2020 Summer Olympics.

Competition record

Personal bests
Outdoor
800 metres – 1:58.13 (Zagreb 2017)
1000 metres – 2:35.73 (Brussels 2013)
1500 metres – 3:58.20 (Doha 2019)
One mile – 4:19.55 (London 2017)
Indoor
800 metres – 2:02.67 (Val-de-Reuil 2013)
1000 metres – 2:40.37 (Moscow 2013)
1500 metres – 4:05.81 (Birmingham 2018)
One mile – 4:34.06 (Birmingham 2019)

References

1990 births
Living people
Kenyan female middle-distance runners
Commonwealth Games competitors for Kenya
Athletes (track and field) at the 2010 Commonwealth Games
Athletes (track and field) at the 2018 Commonwealth Games
World Athletics Championships athletes for Kenya
Athletes (track and field) at the 2016 Summer Olympics
Athletes (track and field) at the 2020 Summer Olympics
Olympic athletes of Kenya
African Games bronze medalists for Kenya
African Games medalists in athletics (track and field)
Athletes (track and field) at the 2015 African Games
African Championships in Athletics winners
IAAF Continental Cup winners
People from Rift Valley Province